Stranded is the third album by English rock band Roxy Music, released in 1973 by Island Records (it was released by Atco Records in the United States). Stranded was the first Roxy Music album on which Bryan Ferry was not the sole songwriter, with multi-instrumentalist Andy Mackay and guitarist Phil Manzanera also making songwriting contributions. It is also their first album with keyboardist/violinist Eddie Jobson, who replaced Brian Eno after his departure following the release of their previous album For Your Pleasure. It was also the first of three consecutive studio albums with bassist John Gustafson.

Stranded reached number one on the UK albums chart. The track "Street Life" was released as a single and reached number 9 on the UK singles chart. In the US, Stranded charted at number 186.

Cover art
The gatefold cover photograph was taken by Karl Stoecker and styled by Antony Price, and shows Playboy model Marilyn Cole. In an interview with the writer Tony Barrell in 2007, Cole recalled:

Critical reception

Reviewing for Rolling Stone in 1974, Paul Gambaccini wrote: "Roxy Music can no longer be ignored by Americans. They may not achieve the commercial success they have in Britain, where Stranded reached Number One, but their artistic performance must be recognized. Stranded is an eloquent statement that there are still frontiers which American pop has not explored."

Reviewing for Creem in 1974, Robert Christgau found Ferry to be an "ambitious" but "oblique" artist and quoted New York artist Sidney Tillem's 1969 thesis on figurative art, "Aspects and Prospects", to conclude his review of the album: "By moral in the context of art I mean a style which executes the deeper social and psychological function of form, as opposed to a particular aspect of vanity called taste. Pop sensibility, pop consciousness, pop sentimentality have been invaluable in clarifying the provincialism and nostalgia that actually permeate a culture that has come to pride itself on sophistication. But they have not resulted in a new art simply because the requisite idealism has been lacking."

In a positive retrospective review, AllMusic critic Stephen Thomas Erlewine wrote of the album: "Under the direction of Bryan Ferry, Roxy moved toward[s] relatively straightforward territory, adding greater layers of piano and heavy guitars. Even without the washes of Eno's synthesizers, Roxy's music remains unsettling on occasion, yet in this new incarnation, they favor more measured material."

Although it was the first Roxy Music album made without Brian Eno, Eno later described it as one of his personal favourite albums by the group.

Covers
Bass guitarist John Taylor, during his solo period after leaving Duran Duran in 1997, organized a Roxy Music tribute album called Dream Home Heartaches: Remaking/Remodeling Roxy Music, which was released in 1999. On it, Ferry and Mackay's "A Song for Europe" was covered by Dave Gahan and "Street Life" was performed by Phantom 5 (a.k.a. Gerry Laffy and Simon Laffy).

Track listing

Personnel
Roxy Music
Bryan Ferry – vocals, piano, electric piano, harmonica, cover concept
Eddie Jobson – synthesizers, keyboards, electric violin
Andy Mackay (as Andrew Mackay) – oboe, saxophone, treatments
Phil Manzanera – guitar, treatments
Paul Thompson – drums, timpani
John Gustafson – bass guitar except on "Street Life"

Additional personnel
Chris Laurence – string bass on "Sunset"
The London Welsh Male Choir – chorus on "Psalm"
Chris Thomas – production, bass guitar on "Street Life" (uncredited)
John Punter - engineer
Nicolas de Ville – cover design
Karl Stoecker – photography

Charts

Certifications

Notes

External links
 Super seventies review on the album

1973 albums
Roxy Music albums
Albums produced by Chris Thomas (record producer)
Island Records albums
Polydor Records albums
Atco Records albums
Reprise Records albums
Virgin Records albums
E.G. Records albums
Albums recorded at AIR Studios